Rana Bokhari (born October 23, 1977) was the leader of the Manitoba Liberal Party from 2013 until 2016 in Manitoba, Canada.

Background
Bokhari was born on a farm near Anola, Manitoba. As a student she attended the University of Manitoba where she obtained degrees in criminology and psychology. She then went on to complete a degree in law at Robson Hall, focusing on corporate commercial law. Bokhari was active in the Manitoba Law Students Association, serving as President in 2012.

Bokhari moved to Pakistan in 2002, living there with her family until she returned to Winnipeg in 2006. Her childhood home and family chicken farm were lost to a fire in 2012.

Political Career
After long-standing Manitoba Liberal Party leader Jon Gerrard resigned his position in 2013, Bokhari was the first person formally to declare her candidacy. She faced two opponents, Bob Axworthy and Dougald Lamont. During the party leadership contest, Bokhari was seen as an outsider. Although two of her relatives had stood as Liberal candidates at the previous provincial election, she had not previously had a profile in the provincial party. Despite this, she was endorsed by the Manitoba Senator Maria Chaput, the leading Liberal candidate from the 2011 elections, Paul Hesse and party Vice-President Robert Young. She won a first ballot victory by one vote, with 431 votes.

The victory made Rana Bokhari the youngest person ever to lead the Manitoba Liberals and the first Manitoban of South Asian descent to lead a political party in the province.

She faced internal criticism from party members and former leadership challenger Bob Axworthy, who accused Bokhari of "purging" longtime Manitoba Liberal members as she solidified control of the party. Party membership and fundraising struggled under Bokhari,.

Bokhari committed to making Manitoba the "hub of something" in her year end interview with the Winnipeg Free Press. She explained "I want Manitoba to be the IT capital of this country or the innovation capital of this country."

In 2014 Bokhari endorsed Winnipeg mayoral candidate Brian Bowman in the 2014 Winnipeg Municipal election.

In the 2016 Manitoba general election Bokhari finished third in Fort Rouge, behind future Manitoba NDP leader Wab Kinew. On May 7, 2016, Bokhari announced that she would not lead the party into the next election but would remain on as leader until her successor was chosen. She ultimately resigned as leader, effective September 24, 2016, and opened a law practice, Bokhari, Smith and Walker, the same month.

On May 31, 2022, Bokhari announced her intention to run for Mayor of Winnipeg in the city's 2022 civic election, to be held October 26, 2022.

Electoral results

References

Living people
University of Manitoba alumni
Manitoba political party leaders
Date of birth unknown
Women in Manitoba politics
Female Canadian political party leaders
Manitoba Liberal Party politicians
Robson Hall alumni
Canadian expatriates in Pakistan
Canadian politicians of Pakistani descent
1977 births